Abel Gezevich Aganbegyan (born 8 October 1932) is a leading Soviet and Russian economist of Armenian descent, a full member of the Russian Academy of Sciences and an honorary doctor of business administration of Kingston University, the founder and first editor of the journal EKO.

Biography
Aganbegyan was born on 8 October 1932 in Tiflis, Soviet Union (now Tbilisi, Georgia), a son of a senior CPSU official. Upon graduating from the Moscow State Economical Institute in 1956 he was employed by the Soviet government structure responsible for salary policy in the USSR. In 1961 he left the official work and started his scientific career. He became an employee of a new scientific institute in Novosibirsk which was quickly filled by young and ambitious persons from Moscow. An active member of the group of mathematical economists which emerged in the USSR in the 1960s, Aganbegyan became an Academy member in 1963 (full member in 1974) and the head of the institute in 1964. He was just 32 years old and had only one published book.

In the late 1980s he was one of Mikhail Gorbachev's chief economic advisers and among the first Soviet economists to voice the need for a restructuring of the economic and business infrastructure of the Soviet Union. His ideas were presented in a number of ideological books on perestroika. He also supported the movement for the reunion of Nagorno-Karabakh with Armenia.

In 1989–2002 he was the rector of the Academy of National Economy under the Government of the Russian Federation. He is a foreign member of the Bulgarian and the Hungarian Academies of Sciences, a correspondenting member of the British Academy.

He is the father of Ruben Aganbegyan as well as Ekaterina Kouprianova.

Books
Aganbegyan is the author of more than 250 peer-reviewed publications and 20 monographs.

Abel Aganbegyan, "Moving The Mountain Inside the Perestroika Revolution", Bantam Press 0593018184, 1989.
Economics in a Changing World: System Transformation, Eastern and Western Assessments Volume 1-3, by Aganbegyan, Abel; Bogomolov, Oleg & Kaser, Michael, 1989.
Economic Challenge of Perestroika, by Aganbegyan, Abel, Macmillan Press, London, 1994

Sources
Biography at Great Soviet Encyclopedia
Biography

References

1932 births
Living people
Soviet economists
Russian economists
Economists from Georgia (country)
Armenian economists
Perestroika
Communist Party of the Soviet Union members
Fellows of the Econometric Society
Foreign Members of the Bulgarian Academy of Sciences
Members of the Hungarian Academy of Sciences
Corresponding Fellows of the British Academy
Full Members of the Russian Academy of Sciences
Full Members of the USSR Academy of Sciences
Plekhanov Russian University of Economics alumni
Recipients of the Order of Lenin
Recipients of the Order of the Red Banner of Labour
Georgian people of Armenian descent
Russian people of Armenian descent
Soviet Armenians
Writers from Tbilisi